Kim Christensen is an American journalist and former investigative reporter in Los Angeles Times who is two time Pulitzer Prize winner. He also has been author in The Capital and Daily Press.

Awards 
His work "Bell's money flowed uphill" which was published on July 26, 2010, got Pulitzer Prize for Public Service. and the Pulitzer Prize for Investigative Reporting with his staff of The Orange County Register in 1996.

References 

Living people
Pulitzer Prize winners
American newspaper journalists
Year of birth missing (living people)